South is a 1987/1988 album by New Zealand musician Shona Laing and her most commercially successful release to date.  It was released twice; in 1987 as a worldwide release, and again in 1988 in the United States. Laing reprised four of the tracks from her 1985 album Genre ("(Glad I'm) Not a Kennedy", "The Migrant and Refugee", "Neat and Tidy" and "Day Trip" retitled as "Your Reputation") for the U.S. release of South (only "Kennedy" was included on the international release).

Three singles from the album reached the charts in New Zealand, Australia and the U.S.; "(Glad I'm) Not a Kennedy", "Drive Baby Drive" and "Soviet Snow". "(Glad I'm) Not a Kennedy" became the biggest hit of Laing's career, reaching number 2 in New Zealand and number 9 in Australia. The song also charted in the U.S. on the Billboard Modern Rock Tracks chart at number 14, the first of two singles to chart in the U.S.; the other being "Soviet Snow" which reached number 32 on the Dance Club Songs chart.

Track listings
All songs by Shona Laing.
"Soviet Snow"
"(Glad I'm) Not a Kennedy"
"Caught"
"The Bishop"
"Highway Warriors"
"Drive Baby Drive"
"Under the Cover of Darkness"
"Poles Apart"
"Neutral & Nuclear Free"
"Dockyard on a River"
"South"
"Soviet Snow" (American Remix)

U.S. release
"Drive Baby Drive"
"Caught"
"Neat and Tidy"
"The Migrant and Refugee"
"Soviet Snow"
"(Glad I'm) Not a Kennedy"
"Your Reputation"
"The Bishop"
"Dockyard on a River"
"Highway Warriors"
"South"

Charts

References

External links
 Official website
 Music.net.nz biography
 CD Universe Sorry

Shona Laing albums
1987 albums
TVT Records albums
Virgin Records albums